A Desk for Billie is an educational American film released by the National Education Association in 1956.

It is based on the story of Billie Davis, who grew up in a migrant family, and how she found educational opportunities.  Davis' story first came to public light when her story I Was a Hobo Kid appeared in the Saturday Evening Post in December 1952.

It was directed by Irving Rusinow, whose other films included Skippy and the Three R's and Freedom to Learn.  The film won a Golden Reel Award in the Education category at the Fourth Annual American Film Assembly.

Primary cast
 Billie as child - Nancy Pinet
 Billie as girl - Joan Lundy
 Father - A. Carroll Edwards
 Mother - Verna Brown
 1st teacher - Bernice Harvey
 2nd teacher - Melva Comfort
 3rd teacher - Peggy Greene

References

External links
 4:07 clip from film on YouTube

1956 films
1950s educational films
American documentary films
1950s English-language films
1950s American films
American educational films
1956 documentary films